Zabarlu (also Romanized as Zabarlū, Zabarloo, Zaberlu, and Zebarlū; also known as Zabazlū, Zaberlyu, and Zabarlī) is a village in Rudqat Rural District, Sufian District, Shabestar County, East Azerbaijan Province, Iran. At the 2006 census, its population was 74, in 18 families.

References 

Populated places in Shabestar County